Billeter is a surname. Notable people with the surname include:

 Hans Billeter, Swiss footballer
 Jean François Billeter (born 1939), Swiss sinologist
 Julius Billeter Jr. (1869–1957), Swiss genealogist
 Tom Billeter (born 1961), American college basketball coach

See also
 Billet (disambiguation)